"Meet El Presidente" is the 16th single from Duran Duran, and the third single from the Notorious album.

About the song 
According to a studio report in Star Hits magazine, one of the early drafts of this song was called "One of the Faithful." A demo version by that name can be found on several bootlegs.

The album version of the song is considerably different from the single and video versions, and from all the remixes. The former's original key and tempo are maintained, but mixes elements of the master to differing degrees for the single release, the main ones being a more emphatic, up-front mix for the percussion, brass, and backing vocal tracks, throughout the song.

Cash Box said it has a "smooth, sophisticated groove."

Duran Duran played this song—among others—live, on the final episode of British music show The Tube.

Music video 
"Meet El Presidente" was the third video directed for Duran Duran by Peter Kagan and Paula Greif.  It was a basic concert video, featuring the band in their stagewear from the Strange Behaviour tour which supported the release of the Notorious album. It was also filmed in black and white Super-8.

B-sides, bonus tracks and remixes 

"Meet El Presidente" was backed by album track "Vertigo (Do The Demolition)". This was the second single from Notorious to have an album track as b-side.

It was also the first single that Duran Duran released as a CD single, on which they included the "Meet El Beat" remix.

There are 3 official mixes of "Meet El Presidente":
 "Meet El Presidente" (7" remix) – 3:38
 "Meet El Presidente" (Meet El Beat) – 5:30
 "Meet El Presidente" a.k.a. "Meet El Presidente" (The Presidential Suite). - 7:12

Formats and track listing

7": EMI. / Tour 1 United Kingdom 

 "Meet El Presidente" (7" remix) – 3:38
 "Vertigo" (Do the Demolition) – 4:43

12": EMI. / 12 Tour 1 United Kingdom 

 "Meet El Presidente" – 7:12
 "Meet El Presidente" (Meet El Beat) – 5:30
 "Meet El Presidente" (7" remix) – 3:38
 "Vertigo (Do the Demolition)" – 4:43
 This 12" is being labelled as "Meet El Presidente" on the cover.
 Also available on CD (CDTOUR 1)

12": EMI. / 12 Club Tour 1 (Promo) United Kingdom 
The Presidential Suite:
 "Meet El Presidente" – 7:12
 "Meet El Presidente" (Meet El Beat) – 5:30
 "Meet El Presidente" (45 Mix) – 3:38
 "Skintrade" (Parisian Mix) – 8:10
 "Skintrade" (S.O.S. Dub) – 7:16

7": Capitol Records. / B-44001 United States 
 "Meet El Presidente" (7" remix) – 3:38
 "Vertigo" (Do the Demolition) – 4:43

12": Capitol Records. / V-15294 United States 
 "Meet El Presidente" (The Presidential Suite) – 7:12
 "Meet El Presidente" (Meet El Beat) – 5:30
 "Meet El Presidente" (7" remix) – 3:38
 "Vertigo (Do the Demolition)" – 4:43
 This 12" is being labelled as "The Presidential Suite" on the cover.

12": Capitol Records. / SPRO-79008 (Promo) United States 
The Presidential Suite:
 "Meet El Presidente" (The Presidential Suite) – 7:12
 "Meet El Presidente" (Meet El Beat) – 5:30
 "Meet El Presidente" (Radio) – 3:38
 "Skintrade" (Parisian Mix) – 8:10
 "Skintrade" (S.O.S. Dub) – 7:16

CD: Part of "Singles Box Set 1986–1995" boxset 
 "Meet El Presidente" (7" remix) – 3:38
 "Vertigo" (Do the Demolition) – 4:43
 "Meet El Presidente" – 7:12
 "Meet El Presidente" (Meet El Beat) – 5:30

 "Meet El Presidente" 7" remix", 45 mix and "radio" are identical versions.
 "Meet El Presidente" and "Meet El Presidente" (The Presidential Suite) are the same version, also known as "The Presidential Suite Mix" (EMI DDNX 331).

Chart positions

Personnel 
Duran Duran are:
Simon Le Bon – vocals
John Taylor – bass
Nick Rhodes – keyboards

With:
Steve Ferrone – drums
Nile Rodgers – guitars
The Borneo Horns – Horns
Curtis King – background vocals
Brenda White-King – background vocals
Tessa Niles – background vocals
Cindy Mizelle – background vocals

Production:
Nile Rodgers – producer
Duran Duran – producer
Daniel Abraham – remixer, engineer and mixer
Larry Levan – remixer, Skin Trade
Mark S.Berry – remixer, "Meet El Presidente"

References

External links 
 TM's Duran Duran Discography

1987 singles
Duran Duran songs
Song recordings produced by Nile Rodgers
Songs written by Simon Le Bon
Songs written by John Taylor (bass guitarist)
Songs written by Nick Rhodes